Wentworth is an Australian television drama series. It was first broadcast on SoHo on 1 May 2013. The series serves as a contemporary reimagining of Prisoner, which ran on Network Ten from 1979 to 1986. Lara Radulovich and David Hannam developed Wentworth from Reg Watson's original concept. The series is set in the modern day and begins with Bea Smith's (Danielle Cormack) early days in prison.

Series overview

Episodes

Season 1 (2013)

Season 2 (2014)

Season 3 (2015)

Season 4 (2016)

Season 5 (2017)

Season 6 (2018)

Season 7 (2019)

Season 8 (2020−21)

Ratings

Notes

References

Lists of Australian drama television series episodes
Lists of LGBT-related television series episodes
Wentworth (TV series) episodes